is a Japanese children's game popular during New Year's celebrations. Players are led to a table which has a paper drawing of a human face with no features depicted, and cutouts of several facial features (such as the eyes, eyebrows, nose and mouth). While blindfolded, the players attempt to place the features onto the face in the correct positions. 

Much like with "Pin the Tail on the Donkey", correct placement tends to be a stroke of luck and incorrect placement an amusing matter, perhaps explaining the name and its translation, "lucky laugh".

The game is thought to date from the late Edo period, and it commonly used an okame-style face of a woman with large cheeks.

The game is similar to the Western game pin the tail on the donkey, except for being performed on a table.

External links

References

Japanese games
Children's games
New Year in Japan